The long-beaked echidnas (genus Zaglossus) make up one of the two extant genera of echidnas, spiny monotremes that live in New Guinea; the other being the short-beaked echidna. There are three living species and one extinct species in this genus. The extinct species were present in Australia. Echidnas are one of the two types of mammals that lay eggs, the other being the platypus. The echidnas retain reptilian features such as egg-laying but display mammalian features such as fur and lactation.

The Eastern species is listed as vulnerable, while Sir David's and western long-beaked echidna species are listed as Critically Endangered by the IUCN.

Species

Zaglossus attenboroughi

 Habitat: known only from the Cyclops Mountains of Papua, Indonesia, New Guinea
 Time: Holocene
 Critically endangered

Zaglossus bartoni

 Habitat: on the central cordillera between the Paniai Lakes and the Nanneau Range, as well as the Huon Peninsula
 Time: Holocene
 Vulnerable

Zaglossus bruijni

 Habitat: highland forests of West Papua and Papua provinces, Indonesia, New Guinea
 Time: Holocene
 Critically endangered

†Zaglossus robustus

 Habitat: New South Wales
 Time: Miocene
 Fossil
 This species is known from a fossil skull about 65 cm long.
 It had many spikes along its back to protect it from its predators and used them as a weapon.

General information
The long-beaked echidna is larger than the short-beaked and has fewer, shorter spines scattered among its coarse hairs.  The snout is two-thirds of the head length and curves slightly downward.  There are five digits on both hind and forefeet, but on the former, only the three middle toes are equipped with claws.  Males have a spur on each of the hind legs.  This echidna is primarily a nocturnal animal that forages for its insect food on the forest floor. The animals are not usually found foraging in the daylight. The long-beaked echidna lives in dens and they are commonly found to be in burrows. The breeding female has a temporary abdominal brood patch, in which her egg is incubated and in which the newborn young remains in safety, feeding and developing.  Since they reproduce by laying eggs and are incubated outside of the mother’s body it is accompanied by the prototherian lactation process show that they are early mammals.  The long-beaked echidna has a short weaning period. During this time milk is their only source of nutrition and protection for the hatchlings; they are altricial and immunologically naive. Like the other species of echidna, long-beaked echidnas have vestigial spurs on their hind legs. These spurs are part of a repressed venom system. Male spurs are nonfunctional and females usually lose their spurs as they age. Little is known about the life of this rarely seen animal, but it is believed to have habits similar to those of the short-beaked echidna; unlike them, however, the long-beaked echidnas feed primarily on earthworms rather than ants. The population of echidnas in New Guinea is declining because of forest clearing and overhunting, and the animal is much in need of protection.

In a study published in 2015 it has been shown that Zaglossus spp. in captivity exhibited "handedness" when performing certain behaviors related to foraging, locomotion, and male-female interactions. The results of this study suggest that handedness in mammals is a basal trait rather than one derived several times in extant mammals.

Evolutionary history
The long-beaked echidna's posture is similar to a lizard with its limbs in a sprawling stance. Although the stances are similar, the way the limbs move are very different. The echidna has a 45 degree swing while a lizards is more horizontal. They also walk with two legs on one side of the body moving together.

See also
 Fossil monotremes

References

External links

 EDGE of Existence (Zaglossus spp.) – Saving the World's most Evolutionarily Distinct and Globally Endangered (EDGE) species
 ARKive – images and movies of the long-beaked echidna (Zaglossus spp.)
 A summary, including references, on animalinfo.org
 (Long Necked) Echidna find rewrites natural history books – 'Mount Anderson, West Kimberley'

Monotremes of New Guinea
Extant Miocene first appearances
Taxa named by Theodore Gill